La Rochefoucauld may refer to:

People
 Adélaïde de La Rochefoucauld (1769–1814), French courtier
 Ambroise-Polycarpe de La Rochefoucauld (1765–1841), soldier and minister of Charles X
 Antoine de La Rochefoucauld (before 1552after 1569), French knight
 Antoine de La Rochefoucauld (1862–1959), 19th century Rosicrucian
 Dominique de La Rochefoucauld (1712–1800), French bishop and cardinal
 Edmée de La Rochefoucauld (1896-1991), French activist
 François III de La Rochefoucauld (1521–1572), French courtier and soldier
 François de La Rochefoucauld (cardinal) (1558–1645), French cardinal of the Catholic Church
 François de La Rochefoucauld (writer) (1613–1680), French author noted for his maxims and memoirs 
 François de La Rochefoucauld, Marquis de Montandre (1672–1739)
 François Alexandre Frédéric, duc de La Rochefoucauld-Liancourt (1747–1827), social reformer
 François, duc de La Rochefoucauld (1765–1848)
 Frédéric Jérôme de La Rochefoucauld (1701–1757), French cardinal of the Catholic Church, Archbishop of Bourges
 Frédéric Gaëtan, marquis de La Rochefoucauld-Liancourt (1779–1863), politician
 Jean-Baptiste Louis Frédéric de La Rochefoucauld de Roye (1707–1746), French naval commander
 Jean-Dominique de La Rochefoucauld (1931–2011), French screenwriter and television director
 Louis Alexandre de La Rochefoucauld d'Enville (1743–92), French aristocrat and politician
 Maxime de la Rochefoucauld (born 1959), Canadian musician
 Robert de La Rochefoucauld (1923–2012), French count and special operations executive

Places
 La Rochefoucauld, Charente, a commune in the Charente département in France

See also
Duc de La Rochefoucauld
Établissement La Rochefoucauld, a school in Paris